Prism World Tour, also known as 2019 Pentagon World Tour 〈Prism〉 was the first concert tour headlined by South Korean boy band Pentagon. The world tour commenced with two shows in Seoul in April 2019 and continued onto Indonesia, North America, Brazil, Mexico, Taiwan, Hong Kong, Singapore and more. On July 5, Pentagon announced additional tour dates for eight cities which covers twenty-three cities worldwide. It began on April 27, 2019 in South Korea and concluded on December 21, 2019 in Japan.

Background
On July 22, Cube Entertainment shares official announcement that Yan An will not be able to participate in 2019 Pentagon world tour "Prism" due to medical reason. 

It has been revealed that on the way back from Jakarta after concluding their concert, the plane which Pentagon had boarded experienced a plane fault and was forced to return to Jakarta. Cube Entertainment responded, "The members are safe without any injuries. They were scheduled to move on for a schedule in Canada but experienced an incident with the plane. Currently, we are looking into other flights as to avoid disruptions to the schedule". It was reported the flight was delayed due to a problem with the air conditioning system, and they did not take off for approximately an hour. There is also said to have been a medical emergency on the flight, leading to the decision to return to Jakarta.

Set list
{{hidden
| headercss = background: #041E42; font-size: 100%; width: 70%;
| contentcss = text-align: left; font-size: 100%; width: 70%;
| header = 
| content =
VCR 1
 "Sha La La" 
 "Gorilla"
 "Violet"
 "Like This" (Acoustic version)
 "Runaway"
 "Just Do It Yo!"  
 "Alien" 

VCR 2
  "Young"
 "Round 1"
 "Critical Beauty" 
 "Skateboard"
 "Can You Feel It" 
 "When It Rains At Night" 
 "Beautiful" 

VCR 3
 "Lost Paradise" (Hui, Yuto, Kino, Wooseok)
 "Till..." (Jinho, Hongseok, Shinwon, Yeo One, Yan An) 
 "Off Road"
 "Smile"
 "Pretty Pretty" 
 "Spring Snow" 
 "Naughty Boy" 
 "Shine" 

Encore
 "Thumbs Up"
 "Spectacular"
 "You Are"
}}

{{hidden
| headercss = background: #041E42; font-size: 100%; width: 70%;
| contentcss = text-align: left; font-size: 100%; width: 70%;
| header = 
| content =
VCR 1
 "Sha La La" 
 "Gorilla"
 "Like This" (Acoustic version)
 "Runaway"
 "Just Do It Yo!"  
 "Humph!"

VCR 2
  "Havana"  (Jinho, Hongseok, Yeo One, Kino)
 "Uptown Funk"  (Hui, Shinwon, Yuto, Wooseok)
 "Critical Beauty" 
 "Skateboard"
 "Can You Feel It" 
 "When It Rains At Night" 
 "Beautiful" 

VCR 3
 "Lost Paradise" (Hui, Yuto, Kino, Wooseok)
 "Till..." (Jinho, Hongseok, Shinwon, Yeo One) 
 "Fantasystic"
 "Pretty Pretty" 
 "Spring Snow" 
 "Naughty Boy" 
 "Shine" 

Encore
 "Thumbs Up"
 "Spectacular"
}}

{{hidden
| headercss = background: #041E42; font-size: 100%; width: 70%;
| contentcss = text-align: left; font-size: 100%; width: 70%;
| header = 
| content =
VCR 1
 "Wake Up"
 "Sha La La" 
 "Gorilla"
 "Like This" (Acoustic version)
 "Runaway"
 "Just Do It Yo!"  
 "Humph!"

VCR 2
  "Bad Guy"  (Jinho, Hongseok, Yeo One, Kino)
 "Best Song Ever"  (Hui, Shinwon, Yuto, Wooseok)
 "Critical Beauty" 
 "Skateboard"
 "Can You Feel It" 
 "When It Rains At Night" 
 "Beautiful" 

VCR 3
 "Lost Paradise" (Hui, Yuto, Kino, Wooseok)
 "Till..." (Jinho, Hongseok, Shinwon, Yeo One) 
 "Fantasystic"
 "Pretty Pretty" 
 "Spring Snow" 
 "Naughty Boy" 
 "Shine" 

Encore
 "Thumbs Up"
 "Spectacular"
}}

{{hidden
| headercss = background: #041E42; font-size: 100%; width: 70%;
| contentcss = text-align: left; font-size: 100%; width: 70%;
| header = 
| content =
VCR 1
 "Sha La La" 
 "Gorilla" 
 "Like This" (Acoustic version)
 "Runaway"
 "Just Do It Yo!"  
 "Humph!"
 "Havana"  (Jinho, Hongseok, Yeo One, Kino)
 "Uptown Funk"  (Hui, Shinwon, Yuto, Wooseok)
 "Critical Beauty" 
 "Happiness" 
 "Can You Feel It" 
 "When It Rains At Night" 
 "Beautiful" 

VCR 2
 "Lost Paradise" (Hui, Yuto, Kino, Wooseok)
 "Till..." (Jinho, Hongseok, Shinwon, Yeo One) 
 "Fantasystic"
 "Spring Snow" 
 "Naughty Boy"  
 "Shine"  

Encore
 "Up! Up! Up!"
 "Spectacular"
}}

Tour dates

Cancelled shows

Personnel

Artists
 Jinho
 Hui
 Hongseok
 Shinwon
 Yeo One
 Yuto
 Kino
 Wooseok

Tour promoters
 Cube Entertainment
 CJ ENM
 Live Nation 
 CKStarEntertainment (Singapore)
 Humap Contents (Singapore, Taiwan)
 MyMusicTaste (Europe)

Ticketing partners
 Yes24 (South Korea)
 Mecimapro (Indonesia)
 Ticketmaster (North America, Latin America)
 Highway Star (Brazil)
 Apactix (Singapore)

References

2019 concert tours
Pentagon (South Korean band)
Pentagon (South Korean band) concert tours